The 2018–19 Belgian First Amateur Division was the third season of the third-tier football league in Belgium, as it was established in 2016. While Tessenderlo won the regular season, Virton became champions by virtue of winning the promotion play-offs. Defending champions Knokke finished last and were relegated together with Aalst and Geel. Oudenaarde was also relegated after losing the play-offs with teams from the Belgian Second Amateur Division.

Team information

Team changes

In
 Rupel Boom was promoted after winning the 2017–18 Belgian Second Amateur Division A.
 Tessenderlo was promoted after winning the 2017–18 Belgian Second Amateur Division B.
 RWDM47 was promoted after winning the 2017–18 Belgian Second Amateur Division C.
 RFC Liège was promoted after winning the Promotion play-offs.

Note that no team from the 2017–18 Belgian First Division B was relegated into the 2018–19 Belgian First Amateur Division due to the fact that Lierse went bankrupt.

Out
 Lommel were promoted from the 2017–18 Belgian First Amateur Division as they were the only team which had obtained a license.
 Berchem Sport and Patro Eisden Maasmechelen finished in the relegation zone (15th and 16th) in the 2017–18 Belgian First Amateur Division and were therefore relegated to the 2018–19 Belgian Second Amateur Division. Patro Eisden Maasmechelen had not applied for a Belgian remunerated football license and would have been relegated irrespective of their finishing position.
 Hamme lost the relegation play-offs and was thus relegated.

Merger
 Oosterzonen Oosterwijk merged with the bankrupt team Lierse to form Lierse Kempenzonen. As such it relocated from Westerlo to Lier.

Regular season

League table

Results

Promotion play-offs
The teams finishing in the top four positions entered the promotion play-offs. The points obtained during the regular season were halved (and rounded up) before the start of the playoff, as a result, Tessenderlo started with 31 points, Deinze with 30 points, Virton with 27 points and Lierse Kempenzonen with 24 points. Deinze was the only team for which the points were rounded up, therefore in case of equal points at the end of the playoffs they will always be ranked below the other teams. Going into the playoffs, only Deinze and Lierse had received a license, meaning that only those two teams are eligible for promotion, although Virton has successfully appealed the decision of not being handed a license and is thus also eligible for promotion.

Number of teams by provinces

References

Belgian National Division 1
Bel
3